Henryk Józef Nowacki (born 11 August 1946) is a Polish prelate of the Catholic Church who has spent his career in the diplomatic service of the Holy See.

Biography
Nowacki was born on 11 August 1946 in Gunzenhausen. He was ordained a priest on 31 May 1970 by Jerzy Karol Ablewicz, Bishop of Tarnów.

On 8 February 2001, Pope John Paul II appointed him titular archbishop of  Blera and Apostolic Nuncio to Slovakia. He received his episcopal consecration from John Paul II on 19 March. On 28 November 2007, Pope Benedict XVI named him Apostolic Nuncio to Nicaragua.

Benedict appointed him Apostolic Nuncio in Sweden and Iceland on 28 June 2012. On 6 October 2012 Nowacki was named Apostolic Nuncio in Denmark, Finland and Norway as well.

He retired in February 2017 for health reasons after a private audience with Pope Francis.

See also
 List of heads of the diplomatic missions of the Holy See

References

External links 
 Catholic Hierarchy: Archbishop Henryk Józef Nowacki 

1946 births
Apostolic Nuncios to Slovakia
Apostolic Nuncios to Nicaragua
Apostolic Nuncios to Sweden
Apostolic Nuncios to Iceland
Apostolic Nuncios to Denmark
Apostolic Nuncios to Norway
Apostolic Nuncios to Finland
Living people
People from Gunzenhausen